Virendra Kumar (Jaati) is an Indian politician and the MLA from Jhabrera Assembly constituency. He is a member of the Indian National Congress.

Virendra Kumar Jaati defeated Rajpal Singh of Bhartiya Janata Party in 2022 Uttarakhand Legislative Assembly election.

References 

Living people
People from Haridwar district
Uttarakhand MLAs 2022–2027
Indian National Congress politicians from Uttarakhand
Year of birth missing (living people)